Gianni Ambrosio (born 23 December 1943 in Santhià) is the emeritus bishop of the Roman Catholic Diocese of Piacenza-Bobbio.

Biography 

Born in Santhià on 23 December 1943, he studied theology in minor and major seminaries of Vercelli and on 7 July 1968 he was ordained priest.

In 1970 he obtained a diploma in social sciences at the Institut Catholique in Paris and in 1972 he obtained the specialization-diploma in sociology at the École pratique des hautes études at the Sorbonne University. He was a member of the international scientific committee of CESNUR.

In 1995 he graduated in theology in Rome at the Pontifical Lateran University.

From 1974 to 1988 he taught religion and was parochial vicar in the parishes of Santhià and Moncrivello. From 1988 to 2001 he was pastor of the parish of St. Paul in Vercelli. In 1996 he was named honorary prelate of His Holiness.

22 December 2007 Pope Benedict XVI appointed him as bishop of diocese of Piacenza, succeeding to Monsignor Luciano Monari. He was consecrated bishop in the cathedral of Piacenza on 16 February 2008 by Cardinal Tarcisio Bertone.

He retired on 16 July 2020.

Publications 
 Ambrosio G. et al., Per una pastorale che si rinnova, Leumann: Elle Di Ci, 1981
 Ambrosio G., Chiesa e mondo in dialogo: dal modello conciliare ai programmi pastorali della CEI, stampa, 1983
 Angelini G., Ambrosio G., Laico e cristiano: fede e le condizioni comuni del vivere Genova: Marietti, 1987
 Ambrosio G. et al., Comunicazione e ritualita : la celebrazione liturgica alla verifica delle leggi della comunicazione, Padova: Messaggero, 1988
 Ambrosio G. et al., Chiesa e parrocchia, Rivoli: Elle Di Ci, 1989
 Ambrosio G. et al., La dottrina sociale della Chiesa, Milan: Glossa, 1989
 Ambrosio G. et al., Percorsi di chiese : un cammino pastorale : Milan 1980-1990, Milano: Ancora, 1990
 Ambrosio G., Da cristiani nella società: la questione sociale in provincia di Vercelli, Vercelli: Edizioni della Sede provinciale delle A.C.L.I., 1991
 Ambrosio G. et al., Messaggi alle chiese : le parole forti del postconcilio, Milan: Ancora, 1992
 Ambrosio G. et al., Cristianesimo e religione, Milan: Glossa, 1992
 Ambrosio G. et al., Parrocchia e dintorni : tracce per una riflessione pastorale, Milano: Ancora, 1993
 Ambrosio G. et al., La carità e la Chiesa: virtù e ministero, Milan: Glossa, 1993
 Ambrosio G. et al., Nuove ritualità e irrazionale : come far rivivere il mistero liturgico, Padova: Messaggero, 1993
 Ambrosio G. et al., La chiesa e il declino della politica, Milan: Glossa, 1994
 Ambrosio G., Zai L., Gioventù virtuale: indagine sui giovani vercellesi dai 17 ai 24 anni, Vercelli, 1994
 Ambrosio G. et al., La formazione della coscienza morale, Rome: AVE, 1995
 Ambrosio G. et al., L'omelia : un messaggio a rischio, Padova: Messaggero, 1996
 Ambrosio G. et al., Il vangelo della carità chiama i giovani, Milan: Ancora, 1996
 Ambrosio G. et al., La Chiesa e i media, Milan: Glossa 1996
 Ambrosio G. et al., Le sette religiose, Milan: Encora, 1996
 Enciclopedia del cristianesimo: storia e attualità di 2000 anni di speranza, Novara: Istituto geografico De Agostini, 1997
 Ambrosio G. et al., Il primato della formazione, Milan: Glossa, 1997
 Ambrosio G. et al., Apocalittica e liturgia del compimento, Padova: Messaggero, 2000
 Ambrosio G. et al., Il progetto culturale della Chiesa italiana e l'idea di cultura, prefazione: Camillo Ruini, Milan: Glossa, 2000
 Ambrosio G. et al., Genitori e figli nella famiglia affettiva, Milan: Glossa, 2002
 Ambrosio G. et al., Fede cristiana e diversità religiosa, Bergamo: Litostampa, 2003
 Ambrosio G. et al., La democrazia in questione: politica, cultura e religione, Milan: Glossa, 2004
 Ambrosio G., L'avventura entusiasmante dell'Università Cattolica : pellegrinaggio alle origini, Milan: V&P, 2006

References

Bibliography 
 Il Nuovo Giornale, settimanale della diocesi di Piacenza

Resources

 Profile of Mons. Ambrosio
 Official site of Piacenza's Diocese

1943 births
Living people
People from Santhià
Bishops of Piacenza
21st-century Italian Roman Catholic bishops